Dundalk Grammar School, is an independent school in Dundalk,  
County Louth. The school is co-educational with both primary and secondary departments. It is one of a small number of schools in Ireland offering students an education from school entry (4 years) until school leaving age (18–19 years). The Junior school offers an 8-year primary programme.  Most students enter the secondary school at 12 years old and complete a six-year cycle where Junior Certificate, Transition Year, and Leaving Certificate programs are completed

Background
Dundalk Grammar School was founded in 1739 as a Charter School by the Incorporated Society for Promoting Protestant Schools in Ireland. In 1835 it was reorganised, largely by the Rev. Elias Thackeray, as the Dundalk Educational Institution. It was in abeyance during World War I, and in 1921 was revived by a local committee and reconstituted as Dundalk Grammar School. This committee was later enlarged and became the Board of Governors.  The Governors are assisted by the school's Board of Management, which has representatives from the Governors, staff and parents.

The school has its roots in the Church of Ireland (Anglican) tradition and now operates under a management body which reflects its Protestant ethos.  The school body is multi-denominational. Over the last two decades the number of pupils at secondary level has increased to approximately five hundred and fifty, of whom roughly one hundred are members of the boarding department which offers weekly boarding for students from 11–18 years.

Notable past pupils

Richard Best, politician; Attorney General (NI)
Sir William Henry Thompson, physician
Sir Gordon Morgan Holmes, neurologist
Canon Rev David Henry Hall, Church of Ireland clergyman and public housing reformer
Leslie Alexander Montgomery, author (under pseudonym Lynn C. Doyle) 
Lieutenant James Samuel Emerson - Victoria Cross (France 1917)
Lieutenant William David Kenny - Victoria Cross (India 1920)
Ian Clarke, computer scientist
Nigel Cox, artist
Colin O'Donoghue, actor
John McGahon, Fine Gael Senator

References

External links
Dundalk Grammar School profile, isbi.com; accessed 27 August 2015.

Educational institutions established in 1739
Private schools in the Republic of Ireland
Secondary schools in County Louth
Boarding schools in Ireland
1739 establishments in Ireland